Glen Campbell's Greatest Hits was the first official Capitol compilation album by Glen Campbell and was released in 1971. The Best of Glen Campbell followed in 1976, covering his later hits in addition to five on this compilation.

Track listing
Side 1:

 "Gentle on My Mind" (John Hartford) - 2:56
 "I Wanna Live" (John D. Loudermilk) - 2:42
 "Wichita Lineman" (Jimmy Webb) - 3:08
 "Try A Little Kindness" (B. Austin, C. Sapaugh) - 2:23
 "Honey Come Back" (Jimmy Webb) - 3:00

Side 2:

 "By the Time I Get to Phoenix" (Jimmy Webb) - 2:43
 "Galveston" (Jimmy Webb) - 2:40
 "Where's The Playground Susie" (Jimmy Webb) - 3:00
 "Dreams of the Everyday Housewife" (Chris Gantry) - 2:45
 "Burning Bridges" (Walter Scott) - 2:28

Production
Producers - Al De Lory
Arranged and conducted by Al De Lory
"Burning Bridges" arranged and conducted by Leon Russell

Charts
Album - Billboard (United States)

1971 greatest hits albums
Glen Campbell compilation albums
Capitol Records compilation albums
Albums arranged by Leon Russell
Albums conducted by Leon Russell